Gheorghe Ionescu-Sisești (16 October 1885–4 June 1967) was a Romanian agronomer. He was elected titular member of the Romanian Academy in 1936, and he was Minister of Agriculture in 1938–1939.

He was born in Șișeștii de Jos, Mehedinți County, in the historical province of Oltenia, Romania. He obtained a Ph.D. in agronomy from the University of Jena, in Thuringia, Germany.

Notes

1885 births
1967 deaths
Romanian agronomists
Titular members of the Romanian Academy
Romanian Ministers of Agriculture
People from Mehedinți County
Commanders of the Order of the Crown (Romania)
Recipients of the Order of the Star of Romania
Grand Officiers of the Légion d'honneur
University of Jena alumni